The following are the standings of the 2006–07 Iran Football's 3rd Division season.

First round

Group 1

Group 2

Group 3

Group 4

Group 5

Group 6

Group 7

Group 8

Second round

Group 1
 Shahrdari Bandar Anzali- Promoted in 2nd Division (2007–08)
 Esteghlal Takestan
 Saba Battery Golestan
 Dorna Tehran
 Rayd Tehran
 Fajr District 2 Tehran- Promoted in 2nd Division (2007–08)
 Shahrdari Shahr-e Qods
 Shahrdari Lahijan

Group 2
 Sharhdari Borazjan
 Foolad Hormozgan- Promoted in 2nd Division (2007–08)
 Shardari Hamedan
 Bargh Kermanshah
 Paris Isfahan
 Persepolis Ganaveh
 Naft Novin Abadan
 Foolad Yazd- Promoted in 2nd Division (2007–08)

References

League 3 (Iran) seasons
4